The Lebanese Republic and the Islamic Republic of Pakistan have close, warm relations. Pakistan has an embassy in Beirut. Lebanon has an embassy in Islamabad. Both countries are members of the Organisation of Islamic Cooperation.

Relations
According to former Pakistani Prime Minister Yousaf Raza Gillani, Lebanon and Pakistan's close relations are "based on shared views on peace and stability in the Middle East as well as aspirations for the future."

Pakistan donated 8 tonnes of relief assistance comprising medicines and food to Lebanon as a token of solidarity for the victims of blasts that took place in Beirut on August 4, 2020.

Economic relations
Bilateral trade between the two nations stands at $35.4 million in 2005–06.

References

External links
 The Lebanese Pakistani Friendship Association

 
Pakistan
Bilateral relations of Pakistan